Muzaffer Özdemir (born 1955 in Gümüşhane) is a Turkish actor. He is best known for his performance as Mahmut in Uzak.

Awards
 Best actor at Cannes Film Festival (2003)

References

External links 

1955 births
Living people
Turkish male film actors
Cannes Film Festival Award for Best Actor winners